Valentinian I (32117 November 375), sometimes called Valentinian the Great, was Roman emperor along with his brother Valens from 364 to 375. During his reign, he fought successfully against the Alamanni, Quadi, and Sarmatians, strengthening the border fortifications and conducting campaigns across the Rhine and Danube. His general Theodosius defeated a revolt in Africa and the Great Conspiracy, a coordinated assault on Roman Britain by Picts, Scoti, and Saxons. Valentinian founded the Valentinianic dynasty, with his sons Gratian and Valentinian II succeeding him in the western half of the empire.

Early life 
Valentinian was born in 321 at Cibalae (now Vinkovci, Croatia) in southern Pannonia into a family of Illyrian origin. Valentinian and his younger brother Valens were the sons of Gratianus (nicknamed Funarius), a military officer renowned for his wrestling skills.

Gratianus was promoted to comes Africae in the late 320s or early 330s, and the young Valentinian accompanied his father to Africa. However, Gratian was soon accused of embezzlement and retired. Valentinian joined the army in the late 330s and later probably acquired the position of protector domesticus. Gratian was later recalled during the early 340s and was made comes Britanniae. After holding this post, Gratianus retired to the family estate in Cibalae.

In 350, Constans I was assassinated by agents of the usurper Magnentius, a commander who proclaimed himself emperor in Gaul. Constantius II, older brother of Constans and emperor in the East, promptly set forth towards Magnentius with a large army. The following year the two emperors met in Pannonia. The ensuing Battle of Mursa Major resulted in a costly victory for Constantius. Two years later he defeated Magnentius again in southern Gaul at the Battle of Mons Seleucus. Magnentius, now realizing the futility of continuing his revolt, committed suicide in August that year; making Constantius sole ruler of the empire. It was around this time that Constantius confiscated Gratianus' property, for supposedly showing hospitality to Magnentius when he was in Pannonia. Despite his father's fall from favour, Valentinian does not seem to have been adversely affected at this time, making it unlikely he ever fought for the usurper. It is known that Valentinian was in the region during the conflict, but what involvement he had in the war, if any, is unknown.

Service under Constantius and Julian 

The conflict between Magnentius and Constantius had allowed the Alamanni and Franks to take advantage of the confusion and cross the Rhine, attacking several important settlements and fortifications. In 355, after deposing his cousin Gallus but still feeling the crises of the empire too much for one emperor to handle, Constantius raised his cousin Julian to the rank of Caesar. With the situation in Gaul rapidly deteriorating, Julian was made at least nominal commander of one of the two main armies in Gaul, Barbatio being commander of the other. Constantius devised a strategy where Julian and Barbatio would operate in a pincer movement against the Alamanni. However, a band of Alamanni slipped past Julian and Barbatio and attacked Lugdunum (Lyon). Julian sent the tribunes Valentinian and Bainobaudes to watch the road the raiders would have to return by. However, their efforts were hindered by Barbatio and his tribune Cella. The Alamanni king Chnodomarius took advantage of the situation and attacked the Romans, inflicting heavy losses. Barbatio complained to Constantius and the debacle was blamed on Valentinian and Bainobaudes, who were cashiered from the army.

With his career in ruins, Valentinian returned to his new family estate in Sirmium. Two years later his first son Gratian was born by his wife Marina Severa. Valentinian's actions and location become uncertain around this time, but he was likely exiled. Theodoret says that this was because he had reacted angrily when a pagan temple attendant sprinkled water on him, saying "I am not purified, but defiled", and striking the priest.

In 357 Valentinian was a tribunus of cavalry, possibly the Joviani in Roman Gaul. In either 359/360 or 360/361 he was in Mesopotamia, and by 362 he was comes and tribunus of the Cornuti. Valentinian was then exiled to Thebes, in the Thebaid of Roman Egypt. Under Jovian he was promoted to tribunus of the scholae secundae scutariorum, a formation of the elite Scholae Palatinae.

Rise to power 
At the news of Julian's death on a campaign against the Sassanids, the army hastily declared a commander, Jovian, emperor. The army still found itself beleaguered by Persian attacks, forcing Jovian to accept humiliating peace terms. Jovian's authority within the empire was still insecure, so he sent a notary Procopius and the tribune Memoridus west to announce his accession. During Jovian's reign Valentinian was promoted to tribune of a Scutarii (elite infantry) regiment, and was dispatched to Ancyra. Jovian's rule would be short – only eight months – and before he could even consolidate his position in Constantinople he died en route between Ancyra and Nicaea. His death was attributed to either assassination by poisoning or accidental carbon monoxide poisoning. Jovian is remembered mostly for restoring Christianity to its previous favoured status under Constantine and his sons.

The army marched to Nicaea, and a meeting of civil and military officials was convened to choose a new emperor. The purple was offered to Salutius, who had refused it once before on Julian's death. The prefect declined, and did so again on behalf of his son when the offer was extended to him. Two different names were proposed: Aequitius, a tribune of the first Scutarii, and Januarius, a relative of Jovian's in charge of military supplies in Illyricum. Both were rejected; Aequitius as too rough and boorish, Januarius because he was too far away. As a man well qualified and at hand, the assembly finally agreed upon Valentinian,  and sent messengers to inform him in Ancyra.

Emperor 

Valentinian accepted the acclamation on 25 or 26 February 364. As he prepared to make his accession speech the soldiers threatened to riot, apparently uncertain as to where his loyalties lay. Valentinian reassured them that the army was his greatest priority. According to Ammianus the soldiers were astounded by Valentinian's bold demeanour and his willingness to assume the imperial authority. To further prevent a succession crisis he agreed to pick a co-Augustus, a decision that might be construed as a move to appease any opposition among the civilian officials in the Eastern part of the Empire and reassure eastern officials that someone with imperial authority would remain in the east to protect their interests.

Valentinian selected as co-Augustus  his brother Valens at Constantinople on 28 March 364. This was done over the objections of Dagalaifus, the magister equitum. Ammianus makes it clear that Valens was subordinate to his brother. The remainder of 364 was spent delegating administrative duties and military commands. According to the 5th century historian Zosimus, who as a pagan was inclined to revile the restorer of Christianity, all the ministers and officials appointed by Julian the  Apostate were summarily dismissed in disgrace, an assertion qualified  by modern authorities. It is certain that some reshuffling of commands occurred along with the division of the provinces, but the changes were strictly based on merit. The Sophists and philosophers who had proliferated in the court of the Julian, drawing large salaries for delusive services, were cashiered.  Valentinian retained the services of Dagalaifus and promoted Aequitius to Comes Illyricum. Valens was given the Prefecture of Oriens, governed by prefect Salutius. Valentinian gained control of Italy, Gaul, and Illyricum. Valens resided in Constantinople, while Valentinian's court was situated in Milan (Mediolanum).

Campaigns in Gaul and Germania 

In 365 the Alamanni crossed the Rhine and invaded Gaul. Simultaneously, Procopius – the last scion of the Constantinian dynasty – began his revolt against Valens in the east. According to Ammianus, Valentinian received news of both the Alamanni and Procopius' revolt on 1 November while on his way to Paris. He initially sent Dagalaifus to fight the Alamanni while he himself made preparations to march east and help Valens. After receiving counsel from his court and deputations from the leading Gallic cities begging him to stay and protect Gaul, he decided to remain in Gaul and fight the Alamanni.
Valentinian advanced to Durocortorum and sent two generals, Charietto and Severianus, against the invaders. Both generals were promptly defeated and killed. In 366, Dagalaifus was sent against the Alamanni but he was also ineffective. Late in the campaigning season Dagalaifus was replaced by Jovinus, a general from the court of Valentinian. After several victories along the Meuse river, Jovinus fought and won a pitched battle with the Alamanni near Chalôn. After his victory he pushed the Alamanni out of Gaul and was awarded the consulate the following year for his efforts.

In early 367 Valentinian was distracted from launching a punitive expedition against the Alamanni due to crises in Britain and northern Gaul. The Alamanni promptly re-crossed the Rhine and plundered Moguntiacum. Valentinian succeeded in arranging the assassination of Vithicabius, an Alamannic leader, but Valentinian was more determined to bring the Alamanni under Roman hegemony. Valentinian spent the entire winter of 367 gathering a massive army for a spring offensive. He summoned the Comes Italiae Sebastianus, with the Italian and Illyrian legions, to join Jovinus and Severus, the magister peditum. In the spring of 368 Valentinian, his eight-year-old son Gratian and the army crossed the Rhine and Main rivers into Alamannic territory. They did not encounter any resistance initially – burning any dwellings or food stores they found along the way. Finally, Valentinian fought the Alamanni in the Battle of Solicinium; the Romans were victorious but suffered heavy casualties. A temporary peace was reached and Valentinian returned to Trier for the winter. During 369, Valentinian ordered new defensive works to be constructed and old structures refurbished along the length of the Rhine's west bank. Boldly, he ordered the construction of a fortress across the Rhine in the mountains near modern Heidelberg. The Alamanni sent envoys to protest, but they were dismissed. The Alamanni attacked the fortress while it was still under construction and destroyed it.

In 370 the Saxons renewed their attacks on northern Gaul. Nannienus, the comes in charge of the troops in northern Gaul, urged Severus to come to his aid. After several modest successes, a truce was called and the Saxons handed over to the Romans young men fit for duty in the Roman military – in exchange for free passage back to their homeland. The Romans ambushed them and destroyed the entire invading force.

Valentinian meanwhile tried to persuade the Burgundians – bitter enemies of the Alamanni – to attack Macrian, a powerful Alamannic chieftain. If the Alamanni tried to flee, Valentinian would be waiting for them with his army. Negotiations with the Burgundians broke down when Valentinian, in his usual high-handed manner, refused to meet with the Burgundian envoys and personally assure them of Roman support. Nevertheless, rumors of a Roman alliance with the Burgundians did have the effect of scattering the Alamanni through fear of an imminent attack from their enemies. This event allowed the magister equitum Theodosius to attack the Alamanni through Raetia – taking many Alamannic prisoners. These captured Alamanni were settled in the Po river valley in Italy, where they were still settled at the time Ammianus wrote his history.

Valentinian campaigned unsuccessfully for four more years to defeat Macrian who in 372 barely escaped capture by Theodosius. Meanwhile, Valentinian continued to recruit heavily from Alamanni friendly to Rome. He sent the Alamannic king Fraomarius, as a Tribune, to Britain in 372–373 with an army in order to replenish troops there and made the noblemen Bitheridius and Hortarius commanders in his army although Hortarius was soon executed for conspiring with Macrian. Valentinian's Alamannic campaigns, however, were hampered by troubles first in Africa, and later on the Danube river. In 374 Valentinian was forced to make peace with Macrian because the Emperor's presence was needed to counter an invasion of Illyricum by the Quadi and Sarmatians.

The Great Conspiracy 

In 367, Valentinian received reports from Britain that a combined force of Picts, Attacotti and Scots had killed the Comes litoris Saxonici Nectaridus and Dux Britanniarum Fullofaudes. At the same time, Frankish and Saxon forces were raiding the coastal areas of northern Gaul. The empire was in the midst of the Great Conspiracy – and was in danger of losing control of Britain altogether. Valentinian set out for Britain, sending Comes domesticorum Severus ahead of him to investigate. Severus was not able to correct the situation and returned to Gaul, meeting Valentinian at Samarobriva. Valentinian then sent Jovinus to Britain and promoted Severus to magister peditum. It was at this time that Valentinian fell ill and a battle for succession broke out between Severus, a representative of the army, and Rusticus Julianus, magister memoriae and a representative of the Gallic nobility. Valentinian soon recovered however and in 367 appointed his son Gratian as his co-Augustus in the west. Ammianus remarks that such an action was unprecedented. Jovinus quickly returned saying that he needed more men to take care of the situation. In 368 Valentinian appointed Theodosius as the new Comes Britanniarum with instructions to return Britain to Roman rule. Meanwhile, Severus and Jovinus were to accompany the emperor on his campaign against the Alamanni.

Theodosius arrived in 368 with the Batavi, Heruli, Jovii and Victores legions. Landing at Rutupiæ, he proceeded to Londinium restoring order to southern Britain. Later, he rallied the remaining garrison which was originally stationed in Britain; it was apparent the units had lost their cohesiveness when Fullofaudes and Nectaridus had been defeated. Theodosius sent for Civilis to be installed as the new vicarius of the diocese and Dulcitius as an additional general.
In 369, Theodosius set about reconquering the areas north of London; putting down the revolt of Valentinus, the brother-in-law of a vicarius, Maximinus. Subsequently, Theodosius restored the rest of Britain to the empire and rebuilt many fortifications – renaming northern Britain 'Valentia'. After his return in 369, Valentinian promoted Theodosius to magister equitum in place of Jovinus.

Revolt in Africa and crises on the Danube 

In 372, the rebellion of Firmus broke out in the still-devastated African provinces. This rebellion was driven by the corruption of the comes Romanus. Romanus took sides in the murderous disputes among the legitimate and illegitimate children of Nubel, a Moorish prince and leading Roman client in Africa. Resentment of Romanus's personal use of public funds and his failure to defend the province from desert nomads caused some of the provincials to revolt. Valentinian sent in Theodosius to restore imperial control. Over the following two years Theodosius uncovered Romanus' crimes, arrested him and his supporters, and defeated Firmus.

In 373, hostilities erupted with the Quadi, a group of Germanic-speaking people living on the upper Danube. Like the Alamanni, the Quadi were outraged that Valentinian was building fortifications in their territory. They complained and sent deputations to the magister armorum per Illyricum Aequitius, who promised to refer the matter to Valentinian. However, the increasingly influential minister Maximinus, now praetorian prefect of Gaul, blamed Aequitius to Valentinian for the trouble, and managed to have him promote his son Marcellianus to finish the project. The protests of Quadic leaders continued to delay the project, and to put an end to their clamor Marcellianus murdered the Quadic king Gabinius at a banquet ostensibly arranged for peaceful negotiations. This roused the Quadi to war, along with their allies the Sarmatians. During the fall, they crossed the Danube and began ravaging the province of Pannonia Valeria. The marauders could not penetrate the fortified cities, but they heavily damaged the unprotected countryside. Two legions were sent in but failed to coordinate and were routed by the Sarmatians. Meanwhile, another group of Sarmatians invaded Moesia, but were driven back by the son of Theodosius, Dux Moesiae and later emperor Theodosius.

Valentinian did not receive news of these crises until late 374. The following spring he set out from Trier and arrived at Carnuntum, which was deserted. There he was met by Sarmatian envoys who begged forgiveness for their actions. Valentinian replied that he would investigate what had happened and act accordingly. Valentinian ignored Marcellianus’ treacherous actions and decided to punish the Quadi. He was accompanied by Sebastianus and Merobaudes, and spent the summer months preparing for the campaign. In the fall he crossed the Danube at Aquincum into Quadi territory. After pillaging Quadi lands without opposition, he retired to Savaria to winter quarters.

Death 
Without waiting for the spring, Valentinian decided to continue campaigning and moved from Savaria to Brigetio. Once he arrived on 17 November, he received a deputation from the Quadi. In return for supplying fresh recruits to the Roman army, the Quadi were to be allowed to leave in peace. However, before the envoys left they were granted an audience with Valentinian. They insisted that the conflict was caused by the building of Roman forts in their lands; furthermore, individual bands of Quadi were not necessarily bound to the rule of the chiefs who had made treaties with the Romans – and thus might attack the Romans at any time. This attitude so enraged Valentinian that on 17 November 375, while angrily yelling at the envoys, he suffered a fatal stroke.

Reputation 
Modern historian A.H.M. Jones writes that although Valentinian I was "less of a boor" than his chief rival for election to the imperial throne, "he was of a violent and brutal temper, and not only uncultivated himself, but hostile to cultivated persons". According to Ammianus, "he hated the well-dressed and educated and wealthy and well-born". Clearly, Valentinian I had his enemies in Rome who wanted to defame him by describing him as an illiterate brute. Although he was a military commander without a scholarly background, he appointed Ausonius, the most brilliant Latin scholar at that time, as tutor for his son Gratian. It proves that Valentinian I appreciated a classical education which he himself had been denied. He was, however, an able soldier and a conscientious administrator, and took an interest in the welfare of the humbler classes, from which his father had risen. Unfortunately his good intentions were often frustrated by a bad choice of ministers, and "an obstinate belief in their merits despite all evidence to the contrary." He was a founder of schools, and provided medical attendance for the poor of Rome, by appointing a physician for each of the fourteen districts of the city. He also reissued an edict of Constantine I making infanticide a capital offence.

Notwithstanding the benevolence of these more generous edicts, Valentinian was remarkable for cruelty and barbarism in his private affairs.
He often had servants and attendants executed on trifling charges, and was reportedly accustomed to keep two bears, known as Mica Aurea (golden flake), and Innocence, in an iron cage which was transported wherever he went, whom he employed to execute the sentence, which he often delivered, of capital punishment. At length Innocence, when she was considered to have faithfully discharged her office, was released with the emperor's good wishes into her native wilds.

Valentinian was a Christian but permitted liberal religious freedom to all his subjects, proscribing only some forms of rituals such as particular types of sacrifices, and banning the practice of magic. Again, Valentinian steadily set his face against the increasing wealth and worldliness of the clergy. He issued a pointed edict via Pope Damasus I, forbidding the grant of bequests to Christian clergy-men; and another forcing members of the sacerdotal order to discharge the public duties owed on account of their property, or else relinquish it.

Socrates Scholasticus gives an interesting account in his Historia Ecclesiastica of Valentinian's marriages, that has inspired some to call this emperor polygamous. According to the text: the empress Justina

This story is known only from Socrates, and there is no trace of any edict by any emperor allowing polygamy. Valentinian I may have divorced Severa according to Roman Law, which allowed for divorce (see Women in ancient Rome). However, since divorce was not acknowledged by Christians, Socrates contemptuously describes him as a bigamist. It is also possible that Socrates attempted to accuse Justina, who was an Arian, of fornication, a common aspersion against other cults. According to John Malalas, the Chronicon Paschale, and John of Nikiu, the empress Severa was banished by Valentinian I for conducting an illegal transaction, before he consorted with Justina. Barnes believes this story to be an attempt to justify the divorce of Valentinian I without accusing the emperor.

See also 

 List of Roman emperors
 Illyrian emperors

Notes

References

Sources

Primary sources 
Ammianus Marcellinus. Rerum gestarum libri qui supersunt. W. Seyfarth, ed. 3 vols. Leipzig, 1978.
 
Consularia Constantinopolitana. T. Mommsen ed., Monumenta Germaniae Historica, Auctores Antiquissimi. Volume 9. Berlin, 1892.
Codex Theodosianus. T. Mommsen, P.M. Meyer, and P. Krüger, eds. Theodosiani libri XVI cum constitutionibus Sirmondianis et leges novellae ad Theodosianum pertinentes (2 vols.). Berlin, 1905.
Corpus Inscriptionum Latinarum. Vol. 6. T. Mommsen, ed. Berlin, 1875.
Epitome de Caesaribus. F.R. Pichlmayr, ed. Leipzig, 1961.
Jerome. Chronicon. R. Helm, ed., in Malcolm Drew Donalson, A Translation of Jerome's Chronicon with Historical Commentary. Lewiston, NY, 1996.
Orosius. Adversus paganos historiarum libri septem. Z. Zangemeister, ed. Corpus scriptorum ecclesiasticorum latinorum 5. Vienna, 1882.
Socrates. Historia Ecclesiastica. J.P. Migne ed., Patrologia Graeca 67. Paris, 1864.
Sozomen. Historia Ecclesiastica. J.P. Migne ed., Patrologia Graeca 67. Paris, 1864.
Theoderet. Historia Ecclesiastica. J.P. Migne ed., Patrologia Graeca 82. Paris, 1864.
Zosimus. Historia nova. François Paschoud, ed. and trans., Zosime: Histoire Nouvelle (3 vols.). Paris, 1971–89.
Ammian, Books 26‑30 Uchicago.edu. English summaries. Main text in Latin.

Secondary accounts 
 
 
 
 
 Edward Gibbon, The Decline and Fall of the Roman Empire, 1776.
  
  Schmidt-Hofner, Sebastian. Reagieren und Gestalten: der Regierungsstil des spaetroemischen Kaisers am Beispiel der Gesetzgebung Valentinians I. Muenchen: Beck, 2008. 398 p. (Vestigia, Bd. 58).
 Ernst Stein, Histoire du Bas-Empire, vol. i, chap. 4 (1959).

External links 

 This list of Roman laws of the fourth century shows laws passed by Valentinian I relating to Christianity.
	

321 births
375 deaths
4th-century Christians
4th-century Roman emperors
4th-century Roman consuls
People from Vinkovci
Anti-German sentiment
Burials at the Church of the Holy Apostles
Deified Roman emperors
Illyrian people
Imperial Roman consuls
Romans from Pannonia
Valentinianic dynasty
Ancient Roman exiles
Illyrian emperors